Flakk is a village in Birkenes municipality in Agder county, Norway. The village is located on the western shore of the river Tovdalselva, across the river from the village of Birkeland which is the municipal centre of the municipality. The lake Flakksvann lies just south of the village.

References

Villages in Agder
Birkenes